David Joseph Platt is an American evangelical Baptist pastor. He was senior pastor at the Church at Brook Hills in Birmingham, Alabama, from 2006 to 2014.  At the time he was the youngest megachurch pastor in the United States. From 2014 to 2017, Platt was president of the International Mission Board.  He became pastor-teacher at McLean Bible Church in 2017.  He is the author of the New York Times Best Seller Radical: Taking Back Your Faith from the American Dream.  Other publications include Follow Me: A Call to Die. A Call to Live, Radical Together, and A Compassionate Call to Counter Culture in a World of Poverty, Same-Sex Marriage, Racism, Sex Slavery, Immigration, Abortion, Persecution, Orphans and Pornography.

Early life and education 

Platt studied at University of Georgia in journalism and earned a B.A.. He also earned a M.Div, Th.M, and PhD from New Orleans Baptist Theological Seminary.

Ministry 
He served at New Orleans Baptist Theological Seminary as Dean of Chapel and Assistant Professor of Expository Preaching and Apologetics. He was serving at Edgewater Baptist Church in New Orleans when the parsonage where he lived flooded during Hurricane Katrina.

In 2006, Platt was introduced as the new senior pastor of The Church at Brook Hills in Birmingham, Alabama. At age 27, he became the youngest megachurch pastor in the United States.

In 2014, Platt was elected president of the Southern Baptist Convention's International Mission Board. The International Mission Board is one of the largest missionary sending organizations in the world.

In February 2017, Platt began serving as interim teaching pastor at McLean Bible Church in Vienna, Virginia.  During this time he continued in his primary role as president of the International Mission Board. In September of that year, Platt was introduced as pastor-teacher of McLean Bible Church.  In February 2018, he announced his resignation from the IMB on the hiring of his successor.

Works

Radical: Taking Back Your Faith From the American Dream
Radical Together: Unleashing The People of God for the Purpose of God
Something Needs to Change: A Call to Make Your Life Count in a World of Urgent Need (2019)
Gospel Threads
Twelve Traits: Embracing God's Design for the Church
God's Love Compels Us
Risk is Right
Counter Culture
Follow Me
Multiply
He Came
To Us a Son is Given
Mission Precision
1 John: Love Made Known Bible Study
Christ-Centered Exposition series, Exalting Jesus in Galatians, Exalting Jesus in 1 & 2 Timothy and Titus, Exalting Jesus in Matthew, Exalting Jesus in James, Exalting Jesus in Psalms, Volume 2: 51-100
Before you vote: Seven questions every Christian should ask"

References

Baptist ministers from the United States
Living people
New Orleans Baptist Theological Seminary alumni
Southern Baptist ministers
University of Georgia alumni
Clergy from Atlanta
1978 births